Allainville is a community in Northumberland County in the Canadian province of New Brunswick.   It is in the parish of Alnwick.

History

Notable people

See also
List of communities in New Brunswick

References

Communities in Northumberland County, New Brunswick